Crystal Township is one of sixteen townships in Hancock County, Iowa, USA.  As of the 2000 census, its population was 529.

History
Crystal Township was founded in 1869. The township was named from Crystal Lake.

Geography
According to the United States Census Bureau, Crystal Township covers an area of 35.5 square miles (91.96 square kilometers); of this, 35.11 square miles (90.93 square kilometers, 98.88 percent) is land and 0.4 square miles (1.03 square kilometers, 1.12 percent) is water.

Cities, towns, villages
 Crystal Lake

Adjacent townships
 Linden Township, Winnebago County (north)
 Forest Township, Winnebago County (northeast)
 Madison Township (east)
 Garfield Township (southeast)
 Britt Township (south)
 Orthel Township (southwest)
 Bingham Township (west)
 Grant Township, Winnebago County (northwest)

Cemeteries
The township contains Crystal Township Cemetery.

Major highways
  Iowa Highway 111

Airports and landing strips
 South 80 Field

Lakes
 Crystal Lake

Landmarks
 Crystal Lake Roadside Park
 Ellsworth College Park

School districts
 Garner-Hayfield-Ventura Community School District
 West Hancock Community School District
 Woden-Crystal Lake Community School District

Political districts
 Iowa's 4th congressional district
 State House District 11
 State Senate District 6

References
 United States Census Bureau 2008 TIGER/Line Shapefiles
 United States Board on Geographic Names (GNIS)
 United States National Atlas

External links
 US-Counties.com
 City-Data.com

Townships in Hancock County, Iowa
Townships in Iowa